Litsea ligustrina is a species of plant in the family Lauraceae. It is native to Kerala and Tamil Nadu in India.

References

ligustrina
Flora of Kerala
Flora of Tamil Nadu
Vulnerable plants
Taxonomy articles created by Polbot
Taxa named by Celestino Fernández-Villar
Taxa named by Christian Gottfried Daniel Nees von Esenbeck